Prairie Serenade is the third studio album by the Western band Riders in the Sky, released in 1982.  It is available as a single CD.

Track listing
 "Prairie Serenade" (Douglas B. Green) – 2:43
 "(I've Got Spurs That) Jingle Jangle Jingle" (Joseph J. Lilley, Frank Loesser) – 2:40
 "Blue Shadows on the Trail" (Eliot Daniel, Johnny Lange) – 3:43
 "Pretty Prairie Princess" (Paul Chrisman) – 2:25
 "Cowpoke" (Stan Jones) – 1:42
 "Nevada" (Chrisman, Karen Ritter) – 2:40
 "Down the Trail to San Antone" (Deuce Spriggins) – 1:57
 "I Ride an Old Paint" (Traditional) – 2:14
 "Utah Trail" (Chrisman) – 3:29
 "Old El Paso" (Green) – 2:16
 "Chasin' the Sun" (Green) – 2:04
 "Home on the Range" (Traditional) – 4:11

Personnel
Douglas B. Green (a.k.a. Ranger Doug) – guitar, vocals
Paul Chrisman (a.k.a. Woody Paul) – fiddle, guitar, mandolin, harmonica, accordion, vocals
Fred LaBour (a.k.a. Too Slim) – bass, guitar, vocals
Kayton Robers – steel guitar
Kenny Malone – percussion

Production notes
Todd Cerney – engineer
Denny Purcell – mastering

References

External links
Riders in the Sky Official Website

1982 albums
Riders in the Sky (band) albums
Rounder Records albums